Michael Andrew Fox  (born June 9, 1961), known professionally as Michael J. Fox, is a Canadian-American retired actor, producer, and television director. Beginning his career in the 1970s, he rose to prominence portraying Alex P. Keaton on the NBC sitcom Family Ties (1982–1989).

Fox is famous for his role as protagonist Marty McFly in the Back to the Future film trilogy (1985–1990), a critical and commercial success. He went on to headline several films throughout the 1980s and 90s, including Teen Wolf (1985), The Secret of My Success (1987), Casualties of War (1989), Doc Hollywood (1991), and The Frighteners (1996). Fox returned to television on the ABC sitcom Spin City in the lead role of Mike Flaherty from 1996 to 2000.

In 1998, Fox disclosed his 1991 diagnosis of Parkinson's disease. He subsequently became an advocate for finding a cure and founded the Michael J. Fox Foundation in 2000 to help fund research. Worsening symptoms forced Fox to reduce his activities and led to his return to television in Spin City when he was still a major movie star. He continued to make guest appearances on television, including recurring roles on the FX comedy-drama Rescue Me (2009) and the CBS legal drama The Good Wife (2010–2016) that garnered him critical acclaim. He voiced the lead roles in the Stuart Little films (1999–2005) and the animated film Atlantis: The Lost Empire (2001). His final major role was on the NBC sitcom The Michael J. Fox Show (2013–2014). Fox retired in 2020 due to his declining health.

Fox won five Primetime Emmy Awards, four Golden Globe Awards, two Screen Actors Guild Awards, and a Grammy Award. He was also appointed an Officer of the Order of Canada in 2010, along with being inducted to Canada's Walk of Fame in 2000 and the Hollywood Walk of Fame in 2002. For his advocacy of a cure for Parkinson's disease, he received an honorary doctorate in 2010 from the Karolinska Institute and an honorary Oscar in 2022.

Early life 
Michael Andrew Fox was born in Edmonton, Alberta, Canada, on June 9, 1961, the son of William and Phyllis (née Piper). William was a 25-year veteran of the Canadian Forces who later became a police dispatcher, while Phyllis was a payroll clerk and actress. Fox is of Irish, English, and Scottish descent. His maternal grandmother was from Belfast, Northern Ireland.

His family lived in various cities and towns across Canada due to his father's career. They finally moved to Burnaby, a large suburb of Vancouver, when his father retired in 1971. His father died of a heart attack on January 6, 1990. His mother later died in September 2022. Fox attended Burnaby Central Secondary School, and now has a theatre named for him at Burnaby South Secondary. At age 15, Fox starred in the Canadian television series Leo and Me, produced by the Canadian Broadcasting Corporation, and in 1979, at age 18, he moved to Los Angeles to further his acting career. Shortly after his marriage, he moved back to Vancouver.

Fox was discovered by producer Ronald Shedlo and made his American television debut in the television film Letters from Frank, credited under the name "Michael Fox". He intended to continue to use the name, but when he registered with the Screen Actors Guild, which requires unique registration names to avoid credit ambiguities (and the possibility that royalty checks would be sent to the wrong actors), he discovered that Michael Fox, a veteran character actor, was already registered under the name. As he explained in his autobiography Lucky Man: A Memoir and in interviews, he needed to come up with a different name. He did not like the sound of "Michael A. Fox" during a time when "fox" meant "attractive" and because his "A" sounded too much like the Canadian "eh?" Fox also disliked the sound of "Andrew" or "Andy", so he decided to use a different middle initial and settled on "J", as a tribute to actor Michael J. Pollard.

Acting career

Early career 
Fox's first feature film roles were Midnight Madness (1980) and Class of 1984 (1982), credited in both as Michael Fox. Shortly afterward, he began playing "Young Republican" Alex P. Keaton in the show Family Ties, which aired on NBC for seven seasons from 1982 to 1989. In an interview with Jimmy Fallon in April 2014, Fox stated he negotiated the role at a payphone at Pioneer Chicken. He received the role only after Matthew Broderick was unavailable. Family Ties had been sold to the television network using the pitch "Hip parents, square kids", with the parents originally intended to be the main characters. However, the positive reaction to Fox's performance led to his character's becoming the focus of the show following the fourth episode. At its peak, the audience for Family Ties drew one-third of America's households every week. Fox won three Emmy awards for Family Ties in 1986, 1987, and 1988. He won a Golden Globe Award in 1989.

Brandon Tartikoff, one of the show's producers, felt that Fox was too short in relation to the actors playing his parents, and tried to have him replaced. Tartikoff reportedly said that "this is not the kind of face you'll ever find on a lunchbox." After his later successes, Fox presented Tartikoff with a custom-made lunchbox with the inscription "To Brandon: This is for you to put your crow in. Love and Kisses, Michael J."  Tartikoff kept the lunchbox in his office for the rest of his NBC career.

When Fox left the television series Spin City in 2000, his final episodes made numerous allusions to Family Ties: Michael Gross (who played Alex's father Steven) portrays Mike Flaherty's (Fox's character's) therapist, and there is a reference to an off-screen character named "Mallory". Also, when Flaherty becomes an environmental lobbyist in Washington, D.C., he meets a conservative senator from Ohio named Alex P. Keaton, and in one episode Meredith Baxter played Mike's mother.

As a result of working on Family Ties, as well as his acting in Teen Wolf and Back to the Future, Fox became a teen idol. The VH1 television series The Greatest later named him among their "50 Greatest Teen Idols".

Film career 

In January 1985, Fox was cast to replace Eric Stoltz as Marty McFly, a teenager who is accidentally sent back in time from 1985 to 1955 in Back to the Future. Director Robert Zemeckis originally wanted Fox to play Marty, but Gary David Goldberg the creator of Family Ties, on which Fox was working at the time, refused to allow Zemeckis even to approach Fox as he felt that as Meredith Baxter was on maternity leave at the time, Fox's character Alex Keaton was needed to carry the show in her absence. Stoltz was cast and was already filming Back to the Future, but Zemeckis felt that Stoltz was not giving the right type of performance for the humor involved.

Zemeckis quickly replaced Stoltz with Fox, whose schedule was now more open with the return of Baxter. During filming, Fox rehearsed for Family Ties from 10 a.m to 6 p.m, then rushed to the Back to the Future set where he would rehearse and shoot until 2:30 a.m. This schedule lasted for two full months. Back to the Future was both a commercial and critical success. The film spent eight consecutive weekends as the number-one grossing movie at the US box office in 1985, and eventually earned a worldwide total of $381.11 million. Variety applauded the performances, opining that Fox and his co-star Christopher Lloyd imbued Marty and Doc Brown's friendship with a quality reminiscent of King Arthur and Merlin. The film was followed by two successful sequels, Back to the Future Part II (1989) and Back to the Future Part III (1990), which were produced at the same time but released separately.

During and immediately after the Back to the Future trilogy, Fox starred in Teen Wolf (1985), Light of Day (1987), The Secret of My Success (1987), Bright Lights, Big City (1988), and Casualties of War (1989).

In The Secret of My Success, Fox played a recent graduate from Kansas State University who moves to New York City, where he deals with the ups and downs of the business world. The film was successful at the box office, grossing $110 million worldwide. Roger Ebert in the Chicago Sun-Times wrote; "Fox provides a fairly desperate center for the film. It could not have been much fun for him to follow the movie's arbitrary shifts of mood, from sitcom to slapstick, from sex farce to boardroom brawls."

In Bright Lights, Big City, Fox played a fact-checker for a New York magazine, who spends his nights partying with alcohol and drugs. The film received mixed reviews, with Hal Hinson in The Washington Post criticizing Fox by claiming that "he was the wrong actor for the job". Meanwhile, Roger Ebert praised the actor's performance: "Fox is very good in the central role (he has a long drunken monologue that is the best thing he has ever done in a movie)". During the shooting of Bright Lights, Big City, Fox co-starred again with Tracy Pollan, his on-screen girlfriend from Family Ties.

Fox then starred in Casualties of War, a dark and violent war drama about the Vietnam War, alongside Sean Penn. Casualties of War was not a major box office hit, but Fox, playing a private serving in Vietnam, was praised for his performance. Don Willmott wrote: "Fox, only one year beyond his Family Ties sitcom silliness, rises to the challenges of acting as the film's moral voice and sharing scenes with the always intimidating Penn." While Family Ties is ending, his production company Snowback Productions set up a two-year production pact at Paramount Pictures to develop film and television projects.

In 1991, he starred in Doc Hollywood, a romantic comedy about a talented medical doctor who decides to become a plastic surgeon. While moving from Washington, D.C. to Los Angeles, he winds up as a doctor in a small southern town in South Carolina. Michael Caton-Jones, of Time Out, described Fox in the film as "at his frenetic best". The Hard Way was also released in 1991, with Fox playing an undercover actor learning from police officer James Woods. After being privately diagnosed with Parkinson's disease in 1991 and being cautioned he had "ten good working years left", Fox hastily signed a three-film contract, appearing in For Love or Money (1993), Life with Mikey (1993), and Greedy (1994). The mid-1990s saw Fox play smaller supporting roles in The American President (1995) and Mars Attacks! (1996).

His last major film role was in The Frighteners (1996), directed by Peter Jackson. The Frighteners tells the story of Frank Bannister (Fox), an architect who develops psychic abilities allowing him to see, hear, and communicate with ghosts. After losing his wife, he uses his new abilities by cheating customers out of money for his "ghost hunting" business. However, a mass murderer comes back from Hell, prompting Frank to investigate the supernatural presence. Fox's performance received critical praise, Kenneth Turan in the Los Angeles Times wrote; "The film's actors are equally pleasing. Both Fox, in his most successful starring role in some time, and [Trini] Alvarado, who looks rather like Andie MacDowell here, have no difficulty getting into the manic spirit of things."

He voiced the American Bulldog Chance in Disney's live-action film Homeward Bound: The Incredible Journey and its sequel Homeward Bound II: Lost in San Francisco, the titular character in Stuart Little and its two sequels Stuart Little 2 and Stuart Little 3: Call of the Wild, and Milo Thatch in Disney's animated film Atlantis: The Lost Empire.

Later career and retirement 

Spin City ran from 1996 to 2002 on American television network ABC. The show was based on a fictional local government running New York City, originally starring Fox as Mike Flaherty, a Fordham Law School graduate serving as the Deputy Mayor of New York. Fox won an Emmy award for Spin City in 2000, three Golden Globe Awards in 1998, 1999, and 2000, and two Screen Actors Guild Awards in 1999 and 2000.  During the third season of Spin City, Fox made the announcement to the cast and crew of the show that he had Parkinson's disease. During the fourth season, he announced his retirement from the show. He announced that he planned to continue to act and would make guest appearances on Spin City (he made three more appearances on the show during the final season). After leaving the show, he was replaced by Charlie Sheen, who portrayed the character Charlie Crawford. In 2002, his Lottery Hill Entertainment production company attempted to set up a pilot for ABC with DreamWorks Television and Touchstone Television company via first-look agreements, but it never went to series.

In 2004, Fox guest starred in two episodes of the comedy-drama Scrubs as Dr. Kevin Casey, a surgeon with severe obsessive-compulsive disorder. The series was created by Spin City creator Bill Lawrence. In 2006, he appeared in four episodes of Boston Legal as a lung cancer patient. The producers brought him back in a recurring role for season three, beginning with the season premiere. Fox was nominated for an Emmy Award for best guest appearance.

In 2009, Fox appeared in five episodes of the television series Rescue Me which earned him an Emmy for Outstanding Guest Actor in a Drama Series. Starting in 2010, Fox played a recurring role in the US drama The Good Wife as crafty attorney Louis Canning and earned Emmy nominations for three consecutive years. In 2011, Fox was featured as himself in the eighth season of the Larry David vehicle Curb Your Enthusiasm. David's character (also himself) becomes a temporary resident of the New York City apartment building that Fox resides in and a conflict arises between the two, whereby David believes that Fox is using his condition (Parkinson's disease) as a manipulative tool. Fox returned in 2017 for a brief appearance, referencing his prior time on the show.

On August 20, 2012, NBC announced The Michael J. Fox Show, loosely based on Fox's life. Fox starred in the show. It was granted a 22-episode commitment from the network and premiered on NBC on September 26, 2013. The show was taken off the air after 15 episodes and was later cancelled.

Fox has made several appearances in other media. At the 2010 Winter Olympics closing ceremony in Vancouver, British Columbia, Canada, he delivered comedy monologues, along with William Shatner and Catherine O'Hara, in the "I am Canadian" part of the show.

Despite a sound-alike, A.J. Locascio, voicing his character of Marty McFly in the 2011 Back to the Future episodic adventure game, Fox lent his likeness to the in-game version of Marty alongside Christopher Lloyd. Fox made a special guest appearance in the final episode of the series as an elder version of Marty, as well as his great-grandfather Willie McFly.

In 2018, Fox was cast in the recurring role of Ethan West on the second season of the ABC political drama Designated Survivor. Fox appeared in five episodes of the show. His character was described as "a Washington attorney with significant connections and a history of great success" who was hired to investigate whether the president of the United States was fit to continue in his position.

In 2020, Fox retired from acting due to the increasing unreliability of his speech. Fox's memoir, No Time Like the Future: An Optimist Considers Mortality, was released that November. In the book, Fox explained that, "not being able to speak reliably is a game-breaker for an actor" and that he was experiencing memory loss. Fox wrote, "There is a time for everything, and my time of putting in a 12-hour workday, and memorizing seven pages of dialogue, is best behind me...I enter a second retirement. That could change, because everything changes. But if this is the end of my acting career, so be it."

In 2021, Fox appeared in one episode of the television series Expedition: Back to the Future and in the animated film Back Home Again.

Other work 
Fox served as an executive producer of Spin City alongside co-creators Bill Lawrence and Gary David Goldberg.

Fox has authored four books: Lucky Man: A Memoir (2002), Always Looking Up: The Adventures of an Incurable Optimist (2009), A Funny Thing Happened on the Way to the Future: Twists and Turns and Lessons Learned (2010), and No Time Like the Future: An Optimist Considers Mortality (2020).

Personal life 

Fox met his wife, Tracy Pollan, when she played the role of his girlfriend, Ellen, on Family Ties. They were married on July 16, 1988, at West Mountain Inn in Arlington, Vermont. The couple have four children: son Sam Michael (born May 30, 1989), twin daughters Aquinnah Kathleen and Schuyler Frances (born February 15, 1995), and daughter Esmé Annabelle (born November 3, 2001). Fox holds dual Canadian-US citizenship. He provided a light-hearted segment during the 2010 Winter Olympics' closing ceremony in Vancouver, British Columbia on February 28, 2010, when he expressed how proud he is to be Canadian. On June 4, 2010, the city of Burnaby, British Columbia granted him the Freedom of the City. Fox and his family live primarily in Manhattan. The family owns a second home in Quogue, New York.

Fox battled alcoholism during the onset of his Parkinson's diagnosis, but has been sober since 1992.

Parkinson's disease 
Fox started displaying symptoms of early-onset Parkinson's disease in 1991 while shooting the movie Doc Hollywood, and was diagnosed shortly thereafter. Though his initial symptoms were only a twitching little finger and a sore shoulder, he was told that within a few years he would not be able to work. The causes of Parkinson's disease are not well understood, and may include genetic and environmental factors. Fox is one of at least four members of the cast and crew of Leo and Me who developed early-onset Parkinson's. According to Fox, this is not enough people to be defined as a cluster so has not been well researched. He told Hadley Freeman of The Guardian in late 2020: "I can think of a thousand possible scenarios: I used to go fishing in a river near paper mills and eat the salmon I caught; I've been to a lot of farms; I smoked a lot of pot in high school when the government was poisoning the crops. But you can drive yourself crazy trying to figure it out."

After his diagnosis, Fox started drinking heavily and grew depressed. He eventually sought help and stopped drinking altogether. In 1998, he went public about his Parkinson's disease, and has become a strong advocate of Parkinson's disease research. His foundation, The Michael J. Fox Foundation, was created to help advance every promising research path to curing Parkinson's disease. Since 2010, he has led a $100-million effort, which is the Foundation's landmark observational study, to discover the biological markers of Parkinson's disease with the Parkinson's Progression Markers Initiative (PPMI).

Fox manages the symptoms of his Parkinson's disease with the drug carbidopa/levodopa, and he had a thalamotomy in 1998.

His first book, Lucky Man, focused on how, after seven years of denial of the disease, he set up the Michael J. Fox Foundation, stopped drinking and became an advocate for people living with Parkinson's disease. In Lucky Man, Fox wrote that he did not take his medication prior to his testimony before the Senate Appropriations Subcommittee in 1999 (partial C-SPAN video clip).

In an interview with NPR in April 2002, Fox explained what he does when he becomes symptomatic:

In 2006, Fox starred in a campaign ad for then-State Auditor of Missouri Claire McCaskill in her successful 2006 Senate campaign against incumbent Jim Talent, expressing her support for embryonic stem cell research. In the ad, he visibly showed the effects of his Parkinson's disease:

The New York Times called it "one of the most powerful and talked about political advertisements in years" and polls indicated that the commercial had a measurable impact on the way voters voted, in an election that McCaskill won. His second book, Always Looking Up: The Adventures of an Incurable Optimist, describes his life between 1999 and 2009, with much of the book centered on how Fox got into campaigning for stem-cell research. On March 31, 2009, Fox appeared on The Oprah Winfrey Show with Mehmet Oz to discuss his condition as well as his book, his family and his primetime special, which aired May 7, 2009, (Michael J. Fox: Adventures of an Incurable Optimist).

His work led him to be named one of the 100 people "whose power, talent or moral example is transforming the world" in 2007 by Time magazine. On March 5, 2010, Fox received an honorary doctorate in medicine from Karolinska Institute for his contributions to research in Parkinson's disease. He received an honorary doctorate of laws from the University of British Columbia.

On May 31, 2012, he received an honorary degree of Doctor of Laws from the Justice Institute of British Columbia to recognize his accomplishments as a performer as well as his commitment to raising research funding and awareness for Parkinson's disease. Fox recalled performing in role-playing simulations as part of police recruit training exercises at the Institute early in his career.

In 2016, his organization, the Michael J. Fox Foundation for Parkinson's Research, created a raffle to raise awareness for Parkinson's disease and raised $6.75 million, with the help of Nike via two auctions, one in Hong Kong and the other in London.

At the 2022 Governors Awards, Fox was awarded the Jean Hersholt Humanitarian Award for his efforts in fighting Parkinson's, having raised over $1 billion for research. The award was presented by friend Woody Harrelson.

Filmography

Film

Television

Video games

Web

Awards and nominations

Honours 
 2000: Honoured by the Family Television Awards for Acting.
 2000: Inducted into Canada's Walk of Fame, located in Toronto, Ontario, which acknowledges the achievements and accomplishments of successful Canadians.
 December 16, 2002: Received the 2209th Star on the Hollywood Walk of Fame in recognition of his contributions to the motion picture industry, presented to him by the Chamber of Commerce.
 2005: Received the Golden Plate Award of the American Academy of Achievement.
 2011: Honoured with the Golden Camera Award for Lifetime Achievement – International.
 2010: Appointed Officer of the Order of Canada – The Officer O.C. recognises national service or achievement.
 2010: Received the National Association of Broadcasters Distinguished Service Award.
 2013: Honoured with the Golden Apple Award by the Casting Society of America.
 2021: Doctor of Fine Arts, honoris causa, from Simon Fraser University.
 2022: Received the Jean Hersholt Humanitarian Award from 95th Academy Awards

Accolades

Notes

Books

References

External links 

 Michael J Fox Theatre
 The Michael J. Fox Foundation for Parkinson's Research
 
 
 

 
1961 births
Living people
20th-century American male actors
20th-century Canadian male actors
21st-century American male actors
21st-century Canadian male actors
Actors with disabilities
American film producers
American health activists
American male film actors
American male television actors
American male video game actors
American male voice actors
American people of English descent
American people of Irish descent
American people of Scottish descent
American people with disabilities
American philanthropists
American television producers
Audiobook narrators
Best Musical or Comedy Actor Golden Globe (television) winners
Canadian emigrants to the United States
Canadian expatriate male actors in the United States
Film producers from Alberta
Canadian health activists
Canadian male child actors
Canadian male film actors
Canadian male television actors
Canadian male video game actors
Canadian male voice actors
Canadian people of English descent
Canadian people of Irish descent
Canadian people of Scottish descent
Canadian people with disabilities
Canadian philanthropists
Canadian television producers
Grammy Award winners
Jean Hersholt Humanitarian Award winners
Male actors from British Columbia
Male actors from Edmonton
Officers of the Order of Canada
Outstanding Performance by a Lead Actor in a Comedy Series Primetime Emmy Award winners
Outstanding Performance by a Male Actor in a Comedy Series Screen Actors Guild Award winners
People from Burnaby
People with acquired American citizenship
People with Parkinson's disease
Disney people